Chaoyang is a town in central Longwen District, Zhangzhou, Fujian Province, People's Republic of China.

Administrative divisions
There are 1 community and 17 villages in this town:

The only community is Chaoxing Community

Villages:
Fumei, Houdian, Wengjian, Pukou, Dengke, Kekeng, Zhangbin, Shizhou, Dashan, Hengkeng, Qiaootu, Xiyang, Liugang, Shuting, Shijing, Liushi, Xinshizhou

References
朝阳镇

Township-level divisions of Fujian
Zhangzhou